Faris is an Arabic masculine given name translating to "knight", "horseman" or "cavalier" (see furusiyya). It has also seen use as western-style surname.

The unrelated Scottish-American surname Faris is an anglicization of MacFergus.

Given name
People with the given name include:
Faris is a masculine given name of Arabic origin, which means "knight." It may refer to:

 Faris Abdalla (born 1994), Sudanese football player
 Faris ad-Din Aktai (d. 1254, Cairo), an Emir (prince) and the leader of the Mamluks of the Bahri dynasty.
 Faris al-Ansari (b. 1984), Afghani who was seventeen years old when captured and held in the United States's Guantanamo Bay detention center 
 Faris Badwan (born 1986), Palestinian-English musician, lead vocalist of The Horrors, and  half of Cat's Eyes
 Faris Glubb (1939–2004), British- Jordanian writer, journalist, translator and publisher
 Faris Haroun (born 1985), Chadian-Canadian-Belgian football player 
 Fares Karam, Lebanese singer and dancer
 Faris Kermani (born 1952), British film director 
 Fāris ibn ʿAlī al-Marīni, also known as "Abu Inan Faris" (1329–1358), a Marinid ruler of Morocco
 Faris McReynolds (born 1977), American artist and musician
 Faris Nimr (1856–1951), Lebanese journalist
 Faris Odeh (1985–2000), Palestinian boy shot dead by the Israel Defense Forces near the Karni crossing in the Gaza Strip while throwing stones in the second month of the Al-Aqsa Intifada
 Faris Al-Sultan (b. 1978), Iraqi-German professional triathlete 
 Faris al-Zahrani (1977–2016), on Saudi Arabia's list of 'most-wanted' suspected terrorists, later executed

Fictional characters
 Faris Scherwiz, alias of a main female character in the video game, Final Fantasy V
 Faris NyanNyan, fictional character in the anime series, Steins;Gate

Surname
The Arabic given name in modern times also came to be used as a surname:
 Muhammed Faris (born 1951), Syrian military aviator.
 Iyman Faris (born 1969), Pakistani-American rogue FBI agent working for Al Qaeda (convicted 2003)
 Paula Faris (born 1975), American television correspondent 
 Sadeg Faris Libyan-American inventor and entrepreneur

Faris is also an unrelated American surname, originating as the anglicization of the Scottish surname MacFergus.
 Alexander Faris, Northern Irish composer and conductor
 Anna Faris (born 1976), American actress and producer
 Basil Favis, Canadian chemist and professor
 Ellsworth Faris (1874–1953), American sociologist
 George W. Faris (1854–1914), American politician, U.S. Representative from Indiana
 Herman P. Faris (1858–1936), committed proponent of the temperance movement
 Peter Faris (b. 1948), Australian criminal lawyer, media commentator and former radio broadcaster
 Sean Faris (born 1982), American actor, model, and producer
 Stephan Faris (b. 1973), American journalist
 Valerie Faris (b. 1958),  American film directors and music video director

See also
Farris (surname)
Ferris (name)

References

Arabic masculine given names